Rugby World Cup '95 is a video game developed by Creative Assembly and published by Electronic Arts for the Sega Genesis and DOS.

Gameplay
Rugby World Cup '95 is a rugby game. The game was EA's first attempt at a rugby union simulation. The game uses the same engine as FIFA International Soccer, adapted by Electronic Arts's Slough development team to resemble the rules of rugby union instead of association football. Like FIFA, the game utilises an isometric viewpoint. The player controls one of the fifteen rugby players on their team at a time, with the ability to switch players on command. The game allows up to four human players at the same time, each controlling a different rugby player. The human players can choose to control a rugby player on the same team or on opposing teams. The remaining rugby players are controlled by the computer.

Four modes of play — Friendly, World Cup, World Cup 95 and League — are available. Friendly engages the player in a single match between two teams of the player's choice. World Cup mode resembles the format of the Rugby World Cup, with the player controlling a team of their choice through a series of matches, starting with ? group matches with the possibility of progressing to ? further matches in a knockout format. World Cup 95 mode features the same format, but with the teams taking part and the order of the matches at the group stage being the same as the 1995 edition of the tournament. League consists of eight teams who contest a double round-robin tournament.

The game features all twenty national teams that participated in the 1995 Rugby World Cup, a further ten countries that participated in the qualifying stages, plus two fictional teams - the EA Barbarians and EA Maulers. The players on each of the teams have fictional names.

Playable nations
There are 30 national teams in the game

Reception
Next Generation reviewed the Genesis version of the game, rating it three stars out of five, and stated that "Rugby World Cup '95 is a quality sports game serving as a great welcome to the sport of rugby, oh, and not to mention the game is damn fun." Mean Machines magazine rated the Genesis version 90% and described it as "a spot-on conversion" of the sport. They described the player animation as "superb", noted that there was no evident slowdown when all thirty players appeared on screen at once, and noted that "absolute control is offered over the players"

Stuart Campbell reviewed the DOS version in PC Gamer, criticising the isometric perspective by stating it was difficult to work out where on the pitch the action was taking place from the markings and where other players on the team were located. He also noted that possession of the ball after a tackle appears to be decided at random, and the kicking controls take too long for the player to carry out and usually get interrupted by a tackle as a result. Awarding the game a score of 52%, Campbell's overall verdict was that it "concentrates on realism at the expense of gameplay, but doesn't make a very good job of either".

Reviews
 Level #7 (August 1995) - Czech magazine
GamePro (Feb, 1995)
Computer Gaming World (Oct, 1995)
Game Players - Apr, 1995
PC Games - Aug, 1995
Video Games & Computer Entertainment - Feb, 1995

References

1994 video games
DOS games
Electronic Arts games
Rugby union video games
Sega Genesis games
Video games developed in the United Kingdom